Lithuania–Malaysia relations are foreign relations between Lithuania and Malaysia. Lithuania has an honorary consulate in Kuala Lumpur, while Malaysia embassy in Stockholm, Sweden were also accredited to Lithuania.

History 

Diplomatic relations between Lithuania and Malaysia were established in 1994, and Malaysia were currently seeking to strength the bilateral relations with Lithuania especially in economic, trade and investment.

Economic relations 
Both countries are seeking to enhance co-operation especially in investments, transport and logistics, food industry, renewable energy and high technologies, and there are some Lithuanians who have started a business in Malaysia. Lithuania also invited Malaysian oil and gas company to bid for a contract to supply liquefied natural gas for its Klaipėda LNG FSRU terminal in Port of Klaipėda and other Malaysian companies to expand halal foods in the country. In aviation, the country also eyes air cargo from Malaysia.

Education relations 
In education, a memorandum of understanding to develop a partnership between the two country universities has been signed between Mykolas Romeris University and Universiti Malaysia Perlis.

See also  
 Foreign relations of Lithuania 
 Foreign relations of Malaysia

References 

 
Malaysia
Bilateral relations of Malaysia